Ellerslie Road, labelled Route 133, is a 2-lane collector highway in Prince County, Prince Edward Island, Canada.

The highway runs from Route 12 (Bideford) to Route 2, the Veteran's Memorial Highway, passing through the communities of Ellerslie and Mount Pleasant.

History
The western half of Ellerslie Road, from the Western Road (Route 2) inward 1.5 miles was first paved in 1975 and the remainder was paved in 1976.

List of roads merging from Route 133

Route 12 (Lot 16 to Tignish)
Western Rd - Route 2 (Mount Pleasant)
Hutchinson Rd
Dystant Rd
Harts Gravel Rd

See also
Summerside

References

Prince Edward Island provincial highways
Roads in Prince County, Prince Edward Island